Lost in the Meritocracy: The Undereducation of an Overachiever  is a 2009 memoir by Walter Kirn. It describes his own trip through the American education system from rural Minnesota to Princeton University.

The author also wrote an earlier essay under the same title for The Atlantic.

The book was reviewed twice in The New York Times. The Times also listed it as a "notable book of 2009".

Other reviews appeared in The Washington Post and Commentary Magazine, and the book was recommended on Time Magazine's "Short List of Things to Do".

References

2009 non-fiction books
American memoirs
Doubleday (publisher) books